Irakli Vashakidze (born 13 March 1976) is a Georgian former professional football player.

Career statistics

Achievements
Dinamo Tbilisi
 Umaglesi Liga: 1998–99, 2002–03
 Georgian Cup: 2003
 Georgian Super Cup: 1999
Torpedo Kutaisi
 Umaglesi Liga: 2000–01
 Georgian Cup: 2000–01

References

External links
 
 

1976 births
Living people
Footballers from Georgia (country)
Georgia (country) international footballers
Association football defenders
FC Dinamo Tbilisi players
Aris Thessaloniki F.C. players
Turan-Tovuz IK players
Gabala FC players
Expatriate footballers from Georgia (country)
Expatriate footballers in Greece
Expatriate footballers in Azerbaijan
Expatriate sportspeople from Georgia (country) in Azerbaijan